Shubham Saraf is a British actor. He is known for his stage work, earning an Evening Standard Theatre Award nomination, and his roles in the Netflix crime anthology Criminal: UK (2019–), the BBC One drama A Suitable Boy (2020), and the Apple TV+ series Shantaram (2022).

Early life
Saraf attended St Paul's School, London. He graduated with a Bachelor of Science in Economics from the University of Warwick in 2013. He then spent a year with the École Philippe Gaulier in Paris before going on to graduate with a Bachelor of Arts in Acting from the Guildhall School of Music and Drama in 2017.

Career
Saraf appeared in the 2014 films Honour and The Cut. He made his professional stage debut in 2017 as revolutionary Dinesh Gupta in Lions and Tigers at the Sam Wanamaker Playhouse. In 2018, he appeared in the BBC One political thriller Bodyguard as PR adviser Tahir Mahmood. He also had stage roles in a gender-swapped version of Hamlet at Shakespeare's Globe and An Adventure Bush Theatre.

The following year, Saraf began starring as Detective Constable Kyle Petit in the Netflix crime anthology Criminal: UK. He was in the main cast of the BBC One drama miniseries A Suitable Boy as Nawabzada Firoz Khan. He appeared in Three Sisters at the Almeida Theatre and Romeo and Juliet at the National Theatre. In 2022, Saraf starred as Prabhu Kharre in the Apple TV+ adaptation of Shantaram and played Nathuram Godse in The Father and the Assassin, also at the National, the latter of which earned Saraf an Evening Standard Theatre Award nomination.

Filmography

Film

Television

Stage

Awards and nominations

References

External links
 
 Shubham Saraf at Insight

Living people
Alumni of the Guildhall School of Music and Drama
Alumni of the University of Warwick
British male actors of Indian descent
Male actors from London
People educated at St Paul's School, London
Year of birth missing (living people)